Greenheys is an inner-city area of south Manchester, England, lying between Hulme to the north and west, Chorlton-on-Medlock to the east and Moss Side to the south.

Elizabeth Gaskell's first novel, Mary Barton, published in 1848, opens with a description of Greenheys, then still a rural area on the outskirts of the city. The writer Thomas De Quincey and pioneer socialist Robert Owen both lived at Greenheys House, overlooking the now culverted Cornbrook river. 

Manchester Science Park is here, on Pencroft Way, Lloyd Street North.

See also
Burlington Street drill hall, Manchester

References

Areas of Manchester